Savickis is a Lithuanian and Latvian language surname derived from the Slavic surname Savitsky. Its Lithuanian feminine forms  are: Savickienė (married woman or widow) and Savickaitė (unmarried woman). The Latvian feminine form is Savicka.

Notable people with this surname include:
Jurgis Savickis (1890-1952), Lithuanian short story writer and diplomat 
 (1952-2018), Latvian composer and sound director

See also
Savickas

Lithuanian-language surnames
Latvian-language masculine surnames